117–119 Houston Street (also known as The Henry Cunningham House or The Henry Cunningham Estate) is a historic building in Savannah, Georgia, United States. A duplex, it is located on Houston Street in the northwestern tything of Greene Square and was built in 1810. It is part of the Savannah Historic District.
Originally built for the founder and first minister of the Second African Baptist Church, Reverend Henry Cunningham and his wife Elizabeth, a business owner. Their home is considered the oldest building constructed for a Person of Color in Savannah.

The duplex is currently configured with the 119 unit as two bedrooms and one bath, and the 117 unit as two bedrooms and one-and-a-half baths. The building is currently operated as a vacation rental.

See also
Buildings in Savannah Historic District

References

Houses in Savannah, Georgia
Houses completed in 1810
Greene Square (Savannah) buildings
Savannah Historic District